Joseph White Harris (February 1, 1882 – April 12, 1966) was a pitcher in Major League Baseball who played from 1905 through 1907 for the Boston Americans. He was born in Melrose, Massachusetts.

In a three-season career, Harris posted a 3–30 record with a 3.35 ERA in 45 appearances, including 32 starts, 26 complete games, one shutout, 12 games finished, two saves, 137 strikeouts, 88 walks, and 317.0 innings of work.

On September 1, 1906, Harris earned the distinction of pitching the longest game in Red Sox (Americans) history. The game lasted 24 innings, with the Red Sox eventually losing 4-1 to the Philadelphia Athletics.

Harris died in his home of Melrose, Massachusetts, at age 84 and is buried in Wyoming Cemetery there.

Sources
Baseball Reference
Retrosheet

References

External links

SABR biography

1882 births
1966 deaths
Boston Americans players
Major League Baseball pitchers
Baseball players from Massachusetts
People from Melrose, Massachusetts
Sportspeople from Middlesex County, Massachusetts
Fall River Indians players
Providence Grays (minor league) players
Willimantic Colts players
burials in Wyoming
Concord Marines players